Orathai Srimanee ( born 12 June 1988) is a Thai international footballer who plays as a midfielder for the Thailand national women's team.

International goals

References

External links 
 
 

1988 births
Living people
Women's association football midfielders
Orathai Srimanee
Footballers at the 2014 Asian Games
Orathai Srimanee
Orathai Srimanee
Orathai Srimanee
Orathai Srimanee
Southeast Asian Games medalists in futsal
Footballers at the 2018 Asian Games
Competitors at the 2011 Southeast Asian Games
Competitors at the 2017 Southeast Asian Games
Orathai Srimanee
2019 FIFA Women's World Cup players
Orathai Srimanee
2015 FIFA Women's World Cup players